Africephala timaea is a moth of the family Gracillariidae. It is known from Malawi and Namibia.

References

Gracillariinae
Moths of Africa
Monotypic moth genera
Gracillarioidea genera
Moths described in 1914